Hemmat Expressway is a route in Tehran, Iran. It starts from Pasdaran Avenue junction and goes towards west. It passes Haghani Expressway, Kordestan Expressway, Milad Tower, Ashrafi Esfahani Expressway and Ziba Shahr in Western Tehran and ends into a two-way road that goes south to Tehran–Karaj Freeway.

It is named after Iran-Iraq war hero Mohammad Ebrahim Hemmat.

Expressways in Tehran